The 1952/53 NTFL season was the 32nd season of the Northern Territory Football League (NTFL).

Waratah won their 10th premiership title while defeating the Buffaloes in the grand final by 23 points.

Grand Final

References 

Northern Territory Football League seasons
NTFL